De Profundis is the fourth album from the Hungarian music group After Crying, released in 1996.

Track listing

Personnel
Gábor Egervári - vocals and flute
László Gacs - drums and percussion
Tamás Görgényi - vocals
Péter Pejtsik - cello, bass and vocals
Ferenc Torma - guitar, synthesizer and vocals
Balázs Winkler - keyboards, trumpet and vocals

Additional musicians

Judit Andrejszky - vocals (2, 15)
Ferenc Csatos - trumpet (2, 4, 13)
Ilona Csizmadia - oboe (2, 4, 11)
János Dégi - trombone (2, 4, 13)
Péter Erdey - horns (2, 4, 11, 13, 15)
Zoltán Fekete - viola (9, 11, 15)
László Hunyadi - bassoon (2, 7, 9, 11, 15)
Gergely Kuklis - violin (9, 11, 15)
János Mazura - tuba (2, 4, 11, 13)
György Reé - clarinet and bass clarinet (2, 10, 11, 15)
Mónika Szabó - flute (2, 7, 10, 11, 15)
Orsolya Winkler - violin (9, 11, 15)
 String, Cello Section (2,11): Dobos Bernadett, Dvorák Lajos, Gál Béla.
 String, Viola Section (2,11): Bolyki András, Fekete Zoltán, Juhász Barna.
 String, Violin Section (2,11): Cutor Zsolt, Jász Pál, Kuklis Gergely, Szefcsik Zsolt, Szlávik Zsuzsanna, Winkler Orsolya.

Notes 

1996 albums
After Crying albums